The 1998–99 Umaglesi Liga was the tenth season of top-tier football in Georgia. It began on 6 August 1998 and ended on 23 May 1999. Dinamo Tbilisi were the defending champions.

Locations

League standings

Results

Relegation play-offs
First Round

Sioni Bolnisi remain at Umaglesi Liga. TSU Tbilisi entered losing side playoffs

Dinamo-2 Tbilisi promoted and renamed as Tbilisi. Kolkheti Khobi promoted.

Second Round

TSU Tbilisi remain at Umaglesi Liga.

Top goalscorers

See also
1998–99 Pirveli Liga
1998–99 Georgian Cup

References
Georgia - List of final tables (RSSSF)

Erovnuli Liga seasons
1
Georgia